G2, G02, G.II, G II, or G-2 may refer to:

Fiction
 Transformers: Generation 2: Part of the Transformers franchise, lasting 1992-1995
 Transformers: Generation 2 (comics), by Marvel Comics
 G2, an android in the movie Inspector Gadget 2

Science and mathematics
 G2, a stellar classification
 G2 (mathematics), an exceptional Lie group
 G2, a soil erosion model 
 G2 gas cloud, an astronomical object on a collision course with the super massive black hole at the center of the Milky Way
 G2 phase, part of the cell cycle
 ATC code G02 Other gynecologicals, a subgroup of the Anatomical Therapeutic Chemical Classification System
 Ovoglobulin G2, a protein in egg white
 Haplogroup G2, a subclade of Haplogroup G (Y-DNA)
 g−2, the notation for the anomalous magnetic dipole moment in physics
 Muon g-2 experiment at Fermilab (E989)
 g(2), degree of second order coherence in quantum optics
 G2, an informal group of fossil bird eggs from the Gobi desert that were later named Gobioolithus major

Computing
 Extreme-G 2, a 1998 Nintendo 64 game
 G2, a model of PowerPC
 Gnutella2, the P2P file sharing Network
 HTC Hero mobile phone, aka G2 Touch
 LG G2, an Android smartphone developed by LG Electronics
 T-Mobile G2, an Android smartphone made by HTC for T-Mobile USA
 Garden G2, an internet proxying tool by Garden Networks
 Cook Codec or RealAudio G2, an audio compression method

Commerce and industry
 G2 Crowd, a peer-to-peer review site
 Gatorade G2, a soft drink
 Canon PowerShot G2, a digital camera
 Contax G2, the second Contax G camera
 Panasonic Lumix DMC-G2, a digital camera
 Slacker G2, a portable audio device for the Slacker music service

Transportation
 County Route G2 (California), also known as Lawrence Expressway
 G2 Beijing–Shanghai Expressway, China
 Glasspar G2, a fiberglass body car
 Grumman Gulfstream II, a business jet built
 G2, the Avirex Gabon IATA airline designator
 Fiat G.2, a 1932 Italian transport aircraft
 G2, a class of driver's license in Ontario, Canada

Military
 G2, a designation in NATO's Continental staff system, related to Military Intelligence
 G-2 (intelligence), the United States Army unit
 Directorate of Military Intelligence (Ireland), commonly referred to as "G2"
 Dirección de Inteligencia, Cuba, also referred to as "G2"
 AEG G.II, a German World War I bomber
 Albatros G.II, a 1916 German biplane bomber prototype
 Friedrichshafen G.II, a 1916 German medium bomber aircraft
 HMAS Nestor (G02), a 1940 Royal Australian Navy N-class destroyer
 Gotha G.II, a German bomber during World War I
 Soko G-2, a 1961 Yugoslavian two-seat aircraft
 USS G-2 (SS-27), an American submarine

Other uses
 G2, The Guardian weekday supplement
 G2 Esports, a European eSports organization
 Group of Two, a proposed informal special relationship between the United States and China
 G-2 visa, a nonimmigrant visa which allows travel to the United States
 G2 (rapper), the stage name of South Korean rapper Kevin Hwang
 G2, a block of character codes in the Teletext character set

See also
 Group 2 (disambiguation)
 2G (disambiguation)
 GG (disambiguation)
 GII (disambiguation)